Ramochitina is an extinct genus of chitinozoans. It was described by Sommer and van Boekel in 1964.

Species
 Ramochitina angusta (Nestor, 1982)
 Ramochitina cornuta (Laufeld, 1974)
 Ramochitina costata (Umnova, 1981)
 Ramochitina martinssoni (Laufeld, 1974)
 Ramochitina militaris (Laufeld, 1974)
 Ramochitina nestorae Grahn, 1995
 Ramochitina ruhnuensis (Nestor, 1982)
 Ramochitina spinipes (Eisenack, 1964)
 Ramochitina spinosa (Eisenack, 1932)
 Ramochitina swifti (Sutherland, 1994)
 Ramochitina tabernaculifera (Laufeld, 1974)
 Ramochitina uncinata (Laufeld, 1974)
 Ramochitina valbyttiensis (Laufeld, 1974)
 Ramochitina valladolitana (Schweineberg, 1987)
 Ramochitina villosa (Laufeld, 1974)

References

Prehistoric marine animals
Fossil taxa described in 1964